Alchemilla is a genus of herbaceous perennial plants in the family Rosaceae, with the common name lady's mantle applied generically as well as specifically to Alchemilla mollis when referred to as a garden plant. The plant used as a herbal tea or for medicinal usage such as gynaecological disorders is Alchemilla xanthochlora or in Middle Europe the so-called common lady's mantle Alchemilla vulgaris. There are about 700 species, the majority native to cool temperate and subarctic regions of Europe and Asia, with a few species native to the mountains of Africa and the Americas.

Most species of Alchemilla are clump-forming or mounded perennials with basal leaves arising from woody rhizomes. Some species have leaves with lobes that radiate from a common point and others have divided leaves—both are typically fan-shaped with small teeth at the tips. The long-stalked, gray-green to green leaves are often covered with soft hairs, and show a high degree of water-resistance (see Lotus effect). Green to bright chartreuse flowers are small, have no petals and appear in clusters above the foliage in late spring and summer.

Selected species

Alchemilla abyssinica 
Alchemilla alpina  — alpine lady's mantle
Alchemilla argyrophylla 
Alchemilla barbatiflora 
Alchemilla bursensis 
Alchemilla conjuncta 
Alchemilla diademata  diadem lady's mantle
Alchemilla ellenbeckii 
Alchemilla erythropoda — dwarf lady's mantle
Alchemilla filicaulis  — thinstem lady's mantle
Alchemilla flabellata  — fan lady's mantle
Alchemilla glabra  — smooth lady's mantle
Alchemilla glaucescens  — waxy lady's mantle
Alchemilla glomerulans  — clustered lady's mantle
Alchemilla gracilis 
Alchemilla hungarica 
Alchemilla japonica 
Alchemilla jaroschenkoi  — holotrichous lady's mantle
Alchemilla johnstonii 
Alchemilla lapeyrousii  — Lapeyrous' lady's mantle
Alchemilla mollis 
Alchemilla monticola  — hairy lady's mantle
Alchemilla orbiculata 
Alchemilla sericata 
Alchemilla splendens 
Alchemilla stricta 
Alchemilla subcrenata  — broadtooth lady's mantle
Alchemilla stuhlmanii
Alchemilla subcrenata
Alchemilla subnivalis 
Alchemilla triphylla 
Alchemilla venosa  — boreal lady's mantle
Alchemilla vestita
Alchemilla vulgaris 
Alchemilla wichurae  — grassland lady's mantle 
Alchemilla xanthochlora

References

Alchemilla
Rosaceae genera